Firefighting is the act of extinguishing destructive fires. A firefighter fights these fires with the intent to prevent destruction of life, property and the environment. Firefighting is a highly technical profession, which requires years of training and education in order to become proficient. A fire can rapidly spread and endanger many lives; however, with modern firefighting techniques, catastrophe can usually be avoided. To help prevent fires from starting, a firefighter's duties include public education and conducting fire inspections. Because firefighters are often the first responders to victims in critical conditions, firefighters often also provide basic life support as emergency medical technicians or advanced life support as licensed paramedics. Firefighters make up one of the major emergency services, along with the emergency medical service, the police, and many others.

0-9
911

A
Advanced life support
Aerial firefighting
Airport Crash Tender
Alarm
Arson

B
Backdraft
Basic life support
Boiling Liquid Expanding Vapor Explosion (BLEVE)
Blues and twos
Brush fire
Bunker gear
Burn
Bushfire

C
Car accident
Carbon monoxide poisoning
Chief Fire and Rescue Adviser
Chief Fire Officers Association
Chimney fire
Combustion
Confined space rescue
Controlled burn

D
Dead Man Zone
Dispatcher
Drafting water
Dry standpipe
Dry riser

E
Emergency evacuation
Emergency medical services
Emergency medical technician
Emergency service
Emergency services
Emergency vehicle lighting
Enhanced 911
Evacuation
Explosion

F
Fire
Fire and Rescue Services Act 2004
Fire alarm system
Fire apparatus
Fire authority
Fire bike
Fire brigade
Fire Brigades Act 1938
Fire Brigades Union
Fire chief's vehicle
Fire classes
Fire code
Fire control
Fire department
Fire department ranks by country
Fire engine
Fire extinguisher
Fire hazard
Fire fighting foam
Firefighting in the United States
Fire hose
Fire hydrants
Fire inspector
Fire investigation
Fire lookout tower
Fire marshal
Fire Master
Fire point
Fire Police
Fire protection
Fire-retardant material
Fire safety
Fire safety officer
Fire Service College
Fire service in the United Kingdom
Fire Services Act 1947
Fire siren
Fire sprinkler
Fire sprinkler system
Fire station
Fire tetrahedron
Fire triangle
Fire Watch
First aid
First Responder
FiReControl
Firefighter
Firefighter Assist and Search Team
Firefighter's Combat Challenge
Firefighting
Firefighting worldwide
FireLink
Firemen's Association of the State of New York
Fireman's carry
Fireman's switch
Firestorm
Firewall (construction)
Flammable liquid
Flash fire
Flashover
Forcible entry
Forest fire

G
Gaseous fire suppression
Glossary of firefighting equipment
Glossary of wildland fire terms
Gold Silver Bronze command structure

H
Haz-Mat
Heat detector
Heavy rescue vehicle
Her Majesty's Fire Service Inspectorate for Scotland
History of fire brigades in the United Kingdom
History of fire safety legislation in the United Kingdom
History of firefighting
Hose Pack
Hose Vacuum

I
Incident Command System
Independent Review of the Fire Service
Institution of Fire Engineers
International Association of Fire Fighters
International Association of Wildland Fire
International Fire Service Training Association
International Firefighters' Day

L
List of firefighting films
List of historic fires
London Fire Brigade
London Fire Brigade Museum

M
Master stream
Medical alarm
Mini Pumper

N
National Fire Incident Reporting System
National Fire Information Council
National Fire Protection Association
National Incident Management System
National Transportation Safety Board
New Dimension programme
New Zealand Professional Firefighters Union
Nomex

P
Paramedic

Q
Quint

R
Regulatory Reform (Fire Safety) Order 2005
Rope rescue

S
Search and rescue
Self contained breathing apparatus
Self-immolation
Siren
Smoke
Smoke detector
Smoke inhalation
Smokejumper
Splash suit
Standpipe (firefighting)
Station Officer
Stop, drop and roll
Structure fire
Super Scooper
Surface water rescue

T
Thermal imaging camera (firefighting)
Turntable ladder
Two-in, two-out

U
UK firefighter dispute 2002-2003
United Firefighters Union of Australia

V
Vehicle fire
Ventilation
Volunteer fire department
Water cannon
Water pressure
Water tender
Wet standpipe
Wetdown
Wildfire
Wildland fire engine
Women in firefighting
World Police and Fire Games

Firefighting